New Cuyama Airport  is a privately owned, public use airport located in New Cuyama, in Santa Barbara County, California, United States.

Facilities and aircraft 
New Cuyama Airport covers an area of 308 acres (125 ha) at an elevation of 2,204 feet (672 m) above mean sea level. It has one runway designated 11/29 with an asphalt surface measuring 3,380 by 60 feet (1,090 x 18 m).

For the 12-month period ending November 7, 2011, the airport had 500 general aviation aircraft operations, an average of 41 per month.

General condition 
The airport was reopened in May 2015. One pilot reports that "the runway is repaved and in good condition, however the parking area is a little rough.". However, the current FAA database now indicates that this airport is once again "closed indefinitely". Airport was recently renovated and has reopened as of October 8, 2022.

References

External links 
 Photos of the New Cuyama Airport and City
 Aerial image as of May 1994 from USGS The National Map

Airports in Santa Barbara County, California
Cuyama Valley
Privately owned airports